The men's 400 metres at the 2007 World Championships in Athletics was held at the Nagai Stadium on 28, 29 and 31 August.

Medalists

Records
Prior to the competition, the established records were as follows.

Schedule

Results

Heats
Qualification: First 3 in each heat (Q) and the next 3 fastest (q) advance to the semifinals.

Semifinals
First 2 in each semifinal (Q) and the next 2 fastest (q) advance to the final.

Final

References
Heats Results
Semifinals Results
Final Results

400 metres
400 metres at the World Athletics Championships